Brexit (portmanteau of "British exit") was the withdrawal of the United Kingdom (UK) from the European Union (EU) at 23:00 GMT on 31 January 2020 (00:00 1 February 2020 CET). The UK is the only sovereign country to have left the EU. The UK had been a member state of the EU or its predecessor the European Communities (EC), sometimes of both at the same time, since 1 January 1973. Following Brexit, EU law and the Court of Justice of the European Union no longer have primacy over British laws, except in select areas in relation to Northern Ireland. The European Union (Withdrawal) Act 2018 retains relevant EU law as domestic law, which the UK can now amend or repeal. Under the terms of the Brexit withdrawal agreement, Northern Ireland continues to participate in the European Single Market in relation to goods, and to be a  member of the EU Customs Union.

The EU and its institutions have developed gradually since their establishment and during the 47 years of British membership, and grew to be of significant economic and political importance to the United Kingdom. Throughout the period of British membership, Eurosceptic groups had existed, opposing aspects of the EU and its predecessors. Labour prime minister Harold Wilson's pro-EC government held a referendum on continued EC membership in 1975, in which 67.2 per cent of those voting chose to stay within the bloc, but no further referendums were held during the subsequent process of European integration, aimed at "ever closer union", embodied in the Treaties of Maastricht, Amsterdam, Nice and Lisbon. As part of a campaign pledge to win votes from Eurosceptics, Conservative prime minister David Cameron promised to hold a referendum if his government was re-elected. His government subsequently held a referendum on continued EU membership in 2016, in which voters chose to leave the EU with 51.9 per cent of the vote share. This led to his resignation, his replacement by Theresa May, and four years of negotiations with the EU on the terms of departure and on future relations, completed under a Boris Johnson government, with government control remaining with the Conservative Party in this period.

The negotiation process was both politically challenging and deeply divisive within the UK, leading to two snap elections. One deal was rejected by the British parliament, causing great uncertainty and leading to postponement of the withdrawal date to avoid a no-deal Brexit. The UK left the EU on 31 January 2020 after a withdrawal deal was passed by Parliament but continued to participate in many EU institutions (including the single market and customs union) during an eleven-month transition period in order to ensure frictionless trade until all details of the post-Brexit relationship were agreed and implemented. Trade deal negotiations continued within days of the scheduled end of the transition period and the EU–UK Trade and Cooperation Agreement was signed on 30 December 2020.

The effects of Brexit will in part be determined by the cooperation agreement, which provisionally applied from 1 January 2021, and formally came into force on 1 May 2021. The broad consensus among economists is that it is likely to harm the UK's economy and reduce its real per capita income in the long term. It is likely to produce a large decline in immigration from countries in the European Economic Area (EEA) to the UK, and creates problems for British higher education and academic research.

Timeline

Following a UK-wide referendum on 23 June 2016, in which 51.89 per cent voted in favour of leaving the EU and 48.11 per cent voted to remain a member, Prime Minister David Cameron resigned. On 29 March 2017, the new British government led by Theresa May formally notified the EU of the country's intention to withdraw, beginning the process of Brexit negotiations. The withdrawal, originally scheduled for 29 March 2019, was delayed by the deadlock in the British parliament after the June 2017 general election, which resulted in a hung parliament in which the Conservatives lost their majority but remained the largest party. This deadlock led to three extensions of the UK's Article 50 process.

The deadlock was resolved after a subsequent general election was held in December 2019. In that election, Conservatives who campaigned in support of a "revised" withdrawal agreement led by Boris Johnson won an overall majority of 80 seats. After the December 2019 election, the British parliament finally ratified the withdrawal agreement with the European Union (Withdrawal Agreement) Act 2020. The UK left the EU at the end of 31 January 2020 CET (11 p.m. GMT). This began a transition period that ended on 31 December 2020 CET (11 p.m. GMT), during which the UK and EU negotiated their future relationship. During the transition, the UK remained subject to EU law and remained part of the European Union Customs Union and the European Single Market. However, it was no longer part of the EU's political bodies or institutions.

The withdrawal had been advocated by hard Eurosceptics and opposed by pro-Europeanists and soft Eurosceptics, with both sides of the argument spanning the political spectrum. In 1973, the UK joined the European Communities (EC) – principally the European Economic Community (EEC) – and its continued membership was endorsed in the 1975 membership referendum. In the 1970s and 1980s, withdrawal from the EC was advocated mainly by the political left, e.g. in the Labour Party's 1983 election manifesto. The 1992 Maastricht Treaty, which founded the EU, was ratified by the British parliament in 1993 but was not put to a referendum. The Eurosceptic wing of the Conservative Party led a rebellion over the ratification of the treaty and, with the UK Independence Party (UKIP) and the cross-party People's Pledge campaign, then led a collective campaign, particularly after the Treaty of Lisbon was also ratified by the European Union (Amendment) Act 2008 without being put to a referendum following a previous promise to hold a referendum on ratifying the abandoned European Constitution, which was never held. After promising to hold a second membership referendum if his government was elected, Conservative prime minister David Cameron held this referendum in 2016. Cameron, who had campaigned to remain, resigned after the result and was succeeded by Theresa May.

On 29 March 2017, the British government formally began the withdrawal process by invoking Article 50 of the Treaty on European Union with permission from Parliament. May called a snap general election in June 2017, which resulted in a Conservative minority government supported by the Democratic Unionist Party (DUP). UK–EU withdrawal negotiations began later that month. The UK negotiated to leave the EU customs union and single market. This resulted in the November 2018 withdrawal agreement, but the British parliament voted against ratifying it three times. The Labour Party wanted any agreement to maintain a customs union, while many Conservatives opposed the agreement's financial settlement, as well as the "Irish backstop" designed to prevent border controls between Northern Ireland and the Republic of Ireland. The Liberal Democrats, Scottish National Party (SNP), and others sought to reverse Brexit through a proposed second referendum.

On 14 March 2019, the British parliament voted for May to ask the EU to delay Brexit until June, and then later October. Having failed to get her agreement approved, May resigned as Prime Minister in July and was succeeded by Boris Johnson. He sought to replace parts of the agreement and vowed to leave the EU by the new deadline. On 17 October 2019, the British government and the EU agreed on a revised withdrawal agreement, with new arrangements for Northern Ireland. Parliament approved the agreement for further scrutiny, but rejected passing it into law before the 31 October deadline, and forced the government (through the "Benn Act") to ask for a third Brexit delay. An early general election was then held on 12 December. The Conservatives won a large majority in that election, with Johnson declaring that the UK would leave the EU in early 2020. The withdrawal agreement was ratified by the UK on 23 January and by the EU on 30 January; it came into force on 31 January 2020.

Terminology and etymology

Following the referendum of 23 June 2016, many new pieces of Brexit-related jargon entered popular use.

The word "Brexit" was voted Word of the Year 2016 by the Collins English Dictionary.

Background: the United Kingdom and EC/EU membership

The "Inner Six" European countries signed the Treaty of Paris in 1951, establishing the European Coal and Steel Community (ECSC). The 1955 Messina Conference deemed that the ECSC was a success, and resolved to extend the concept further, thereby leading to the 1957 Treaties of Rome establishing the European Economic Community (EEC) and the European Atomic Energy Community (Euratom). In 1967, these became known as the European Communities (EC). The UK attempted to join in 1963 and 1967, but these applications were vetoed by the President of France, Charles de Gaulle, who feared the UK would be a Trojan horse for US influence.

Some time after de Gaulle resigned in 1969, the UK successfully applied for European Communities (EC) membership. Membership of the then EEC was thoroughly discussed at the long debate in the House of Commons in October 1971. It led to the decisive vote in favour of membership by 356 to 244. As historian Piers Ludlow observed, the 1971 parliamentary debate was of high quality and considered all issues. The British were not "misled and persuaded to accept membership in a narrow commercial entity without being aware that the EEC was a political project liable to develop in the future". The Conservative prime minister Edward Heath signed the Treaty of Accession in 1972. Parliament passed the European Communities Act later that year and the UK joined Denmark and the Republic of Ireland in becoming a member on 1 January 1973, without referendum.

During the 1970s and 1980s, the Labour Party was the more Eurosceptic of the two major parties, and the Conservatives the more Europhile. Labour won the February 1974 general election without a majority and then contested the subsequent October 1974 general election with a commitment to renegotiate Britain's terms of membership of the EC, believing them to be unfavourable, and then hold a referendum on whether to remain in the EC on the new terms. Labour again won the election (this time with a small majority), and in 1975 the UK held its first ever national referendum, asking whether the UK should remain in the EC. Despite significant division within the ruling Labour Party, all major political parties and the mainstream press supported continuing membership of the EC. On 5 June 1975, 67.2% of the electorate and all but two British counties and regions voted to stay in; support for the UK to leave the EC in 1975 appears unrelated to the support for Leave in the 2016 referendum.

In 1979, the UK secured its first opt-out, although the expression was not contemporary; it was the only EEC country not to take part in the European Monetary System.

The Labour Party campaigned in the 1983 general election on a commitment to withdraw from the EC without a referendum. After their heavy defeat in that election, Labour changed its policy. In 1985, the second Margaret Thatcher government ratified the Single European Act—the first major revision to the Treaty of Rome—without a referendum.

In October 1990, under pressure from senior ministers and despite Thatcher's deep reservations, the UK joined the European Exchange Rate Mechanism (ERM), with the pound sterling pegged to the deutschmark. Thatcher resigned as Prime Minister the following month, amid Conservative Party divisions arising partly from her increasingly Eurosceptic views. The UK was forced to withdraw from the ERM on Black Wednesday in September 1992, after the pound sterlingcame under pressure from currency speculation. Italy left the same month, but would soon rejoin on a different band. The UK did not seek re-entry and remained outside the ERM.

On 1 November 1993, after the UK and the other eleven member states had ratified, the EC became the EU under the Maastricht Treaty compromise between member states seeking deeper integration and those wishing to retain greater national control in the economic and political union. Denmark, France, and the Republic of Ireland held referendums to ratify the Maastricht Treaty. In accordance with Constitution of the United Kingdom, specifically that of parliamentary sovereignty, ratification in the UK was not subject to approval by referendum. Despite this, British constitutional historian Vernon Bogdanor wrote that there was "a clear constitutional rationale for requiring a referendum" because although MPs are entrusted with legislative power by the electorate, they are not given authority to transfer that power (the UK's previous three referendums all concerned this). Further, as the ratification of the treaty was in the manifestos of the three major political parties, voters opposed to ratification had limited options for expressing this. For Bogdanor, while the ratification by the House of Commons might be legal, it would not be legitimate—which requires popular consent. The way in which the treaty was ratified, he judged, was "likely to have fundamental consequences both for British politics and for Britain's relationship with the [EC]."

Euroscepticism in the United Kingdom 

Thatcher, who had previously supported the common market and the Single European Act, in the Bruges speech of 1988 warned against "a European super-state exercising a new dominance from Brussels". She influenced Daniel Hannan, who in 1990 founded the Oxford Campaign for Independent Britain; "With hindsight, some see this as the start of the campaign for Brexit", the Financial Times later wrote. The vote to approve the Maastricht Treaty in 1993 triggered a strong Eurosceptic response, splitting the Conservative Party and leading to many past supporters forming alternative Eurosceptic parties. This included Sir James Goldsmith forming the Referendum Party in 1994 to contest the 1997 general election on a platform of providing a referendum on the nature of the UK's relationship with the rest of the EU. The party fielded candidates in 547 constituencies at that election, and won 810,860 votes—2.6% of the total votes cast—but failed to win a parliamentary seat because the vote was spread across the country. The Referendum Party disbanded after Goldsmith's death in 1997.. The UK Independence Party (UKIP), a Eurosceptic political party, was formed in response to Maastricht in 1993. In 1997, Nigel Farage took over the leadership of the party as a right-of-centre, populist movement in England.

Prior to 2013, the issue of EU membership never scored higher that 5% on surveys of voter priorities, polling just 6% in 2013 and 11% in 2014. However, an increasing proportion of voters viewed immigration and asylum as of key importance. By adopting a hardline anti-immigration platform and conflating the issue with EU membership, UKIP was able to achieve electoral success, reaching third place in the UK during the 2004 European elections, second place in the 2009 European elections and first place in the 2014 European elections, with 27.5% of the total vote. This was the first time since the 1910 general election that any party other than Labour or the Conservatives had taken the largest share of the vote in a nationwide election. This electoral success and internal pressure, including from many of the remaining Maastricht Rebels within the ruling Conservative party, put pressure on leader and Prime Minister David Cameron, as potential voter defections to UKIP threatened defeat in the 2015 United Kingdom general election. This threat was emphasised by UKIP winning two by-elections (in Clacton and Rochester and Strood, triggered by defecting Conservative MPs) in 2014.

Opinion polls 1977–2015 

Both pro- and anti-EU views had majority support at different times from 1977 to 2015. In the EC membership referendum of 1975, two-thirds of British voters favoured continued EC membership. Over the decades of UK-EU membership, Euroscepticism existed on both the left and right of British politics.

According to a statistical analysis published in April 2016 by Professor John Curtice of Strathclyde University, surveys showed an increase in Euroscepticism (broadly defined as a wish to leave the EU or stay in the EU and try to reduce the EU's powers) from 38% in 1993 to 65% in 2015. The BSA survey for the period of July–November 2015 showed that 60% backed the option to continue as a member and 30% backed withdrawal.

Referendum of 2016

Negotiations for membership reform

In 2012, Prime Minister David Cameron initially rejected calls for a referendum on the UK's EU membership, but then suggested the possibility of a future referendum to endorse his proposed renegotiation of Britain's relationship with the rest of the EU. According to the BBC, "The prime minister acknowledged the need to ensure the UK's [renegotiated] position within the [EU] had 'the full-hearted support of the British people' but they needed to show 'tactical and strategic patience'." On 23 January 2013, under pressure from many of his MPs and from the rise of UKIP, Cameron promised in his Bloomberg speech that a Conservative government would hold an in-or-out referendum on EU membership before the end of 2017, on a renegotiated package, if elected in the 7 May 2015 general election. This was included in the Conservative Party manifesto for the election.

The Conservative Party won the election with a majority. Soon afterwards, the European Union Referendum Act 2015 was introduced into Parliament to enable the referendum. Cameron favoured remaining in a reformed EU, and sought to renegotiate on four key points: protection of the single market for non-eurozone countries, reduction of "red tape", exempting Britain from "ever-closer union", and restricting immigration from the rest of the EU.

In December 2015, opinion polls showed a clear majority in favour of remaining in the EU; they also showed support would drop if Cameron did not negotiate adequate safeguards for non-eurozone member states, and restrictions on benefits for non-UK EU citizens.

The outcome of the renegotiations was revealed in February 2016. Some limits to in-work benefits for new EU immigrants were agreed, but before they could be applied, a member state such as the UK would have to get permission from the European Commission and then from the European Council, which is composed of the heads of government of every member state.

In a speech to the House of Commons on 22 February 2016, Cameron announced a referendum date of 23 June 2016, and commented on the renegotiation settlement. He spoke of an intention to trigger the Article 50 process immediately following a Leave vote and of the "two-year time period to negotiate the arrangements for exit."

After the original wording for the referendum question was challenged, the government agreed to change the official referendum question to "Should the United Kingdom remain a member of the European Union or leave the European Union?"

Referendum result

In the referendum 51.89% voted in favour of leaving the EU (Leave), and 48.11% voted in favour of remaining a member of the EU (Remain). After this result, Cameron resigned on 13 July 2016, with Theresa May becoming Prime Minister after a leadership contest. A petition calling for a second referendum attracted more than four million signatures, but was rejected by the government on 9 July.

Voter demographics and trends

A 2017 study published in the journal Economic Policy showed that the Leave vote tended to be greater in areas which had lower incomes and high unemployment, a strong tradition of manufacturing employment, and in which the population had fewer qualifications. It also tended to be greater where there was a large flow of Eastern European migrants (mainly low-skilled workers) into areas with a large share of native low-skilled workers. Those in lower social grades (especially the working class) were more likely to vote Leave, while those in higher social grades (especially the upper middle class) more likely to vote Remain. Studies found that the Leave vote tended to be higher in areas affected by economic decline, high rates of suicides and drug-related deaths, and austerity reforms introduced in 2010.

Studies suggest that older people were more likely to vote Leave, and younger people more likely to vote Remain. According to Thomas Sampson, an economist at the London School of Economics, "Older and less-educated voters were more likely to vote 'leave' [...] A majority of white voters wanted to leave, but only 33% of Asian voters and 27% of black voters chose leave. [...] Leaving the European Union received support from across the political spectrum [...] Voting to leave the European Union was strongly associated with holding socially conservative political beliefs, opposing cosmopolitanism, and thinking life in Britain is getting worse."

Polling conducted by YouGov supported these conclusions, showing that factors such as age, political party affiliation, education, and household income were the primary factors indicating how people would vote. For example, Conservative Party voters were 61% likely to vote leave, compared to Labour Party voters, who were 35% likely to vote leave. Age was one of the biggest factors affecting whether someone would vote leave, with 64% of people over the age of 65 likely to vote leave, whereas 18-24 year olds were only 29% likely to vote leave. Education was another factor indicating voting likelihood: people with a GCSE or lower level of education were 70% likely to vote leave, whereas university graduates were only 32% likely to vote leave. Household income was another important factor, with households earning less than £20,000 62% likely to vote leave, compared to households earning £60,000 or more, which were only 35% likely to vote leave.

There were major variations in geographic support for each side. Scotland and Northern Ireland both returned majorities for remain, although these had a relatively small impact on the overall result as England has a much larger population. There were also significant regional differences within England, with most of London returning a majority remain vote, alongside urban centres in northern England such as Manchester and Liverpool, which returned remain majorities of 60% and 58% respectively. Opposite trends appeared in industrial and post-industrial areas of northern England, with areas such as North Lincolnshire and South Tyneside both heavily supporting leave.

Opinion polls found that Leave voters believed leaving the EU was "more likely to bring about a better immigration system, improved border controls, a fairer welfare system, better quality of life, and the ability to control our own laws", while Remain voters believed EU membership "would be better for the economy, international investment, and the UK's influence in the world." Polls found that the main reasons people voted Leave were "the principle that decisions about the UK should be taken in the UK", and that leaving "offered the best chance for the UK to regain control over immigration and its own borders." The main reason people voted Remain was that "the risks of voting to leave the EU looked too great when it came to things like the economy, jobs and prices."

Post-referendum investigations

Following the referendum, a series of irregularities related to campaign spending were investigated by the Electoral Commission, which subsequently issued a large number of fines. In February 2017, the main campaign group for the "Leave" vote, Leave.EU, was fined £50,000 for sending marketing messages without permission. In December 2017, the Electoral Commission fined two pro-EU groups, the Liberal Democrats (£18,000) and Open Britain (£1,250), for breaches of campaign finance rules during the referendum campaign. In May 2018, the Electoral Commission fined Leave.EU £70,000 for unlawfully overspending and inaccurately reporting loans from Arron Banks totalling £6 million. Smaller fines were levelled against the pro-EU campaign group Best for Our Future and two trade union donors for inaccurate reporting. In July 2018 Vote Leave was fined £61,000 for overspending, not declaring finances shared with BeLeave, and failing to comply with investigators.

In November 2017, the Electoral Commission launched a probe into claims that Russia had attempted to sway public opinion over the referendum using social media platforms such as Twitter and Facebook.

In February 2019, the parliamentary Digital, Culture, Media and Sport Committee called for an inquiry into "foreign influence, disinformation, funding, voter manipulation, and the sharing of data" in the Brexit vote.

In July 2020, Intelligence and Security Committee of Parliament published a report which accused the UK government of actively avoiding investigating whether Russia interfered with public opinion. The report did not pass judgement over whether Russian information operations had an impact on the result.

Withdrawal process
Withdrawal from the European Union is governed by Article 50 of the Treaty on European Union. It was originally drafted by Lord Kerr of Kinlochard, and introduced by the Treaty of Lisbon which entered into force in 2009. The article states that any member state can withdraw "in accordance with its own constitutional requirements" by notifying the European Council of its intention to do so. The notification triggers a two-year negotiation period, in which the EU must "negotiate and conclude an agreement with [the leaving] State, setting out the arrangements for its withdrawal, taking account of the framework for its future relationship with the [European] Union". If no agreement is reached within the two years, the membership ends without an agreement, unless an extension is unanimously agreed among all EU states, including the withdrawing state. On the EU side, the agreement needs to be ratified by qualified majority in the European Council, and by the European Parliament.

Invocation of Article 50

The 2015 Referendum Act did not expressly require Article 50 to be invoked, but prior to the referendum, the British government said it would respect the result. When Cameron resigned following the referendum, he said that it would be for the incoming prime minister to invoke Article 50. The new prime minister, Theresa May, said she would wait until 2017 to invoke the article, in order to prepare for the negotiations. In October 2016, she said Britain would trigger Article 50 in March 2017, and in December she gained the support of MP's for her timetable.

In January 2017, the Supreme Court of the United Kingdom ruled in the Miller case that government could only invoke Article 50 if authorised by an act of parliament to do so. The government subsequently introduced a bill for that purpose, and it was passed into law on 16 March as the European Union (Notification of Withdrawal) Act 2017. On 29 March, Theresa May triggered Article 50 when Tim Barrow, the British ambassador to the EU, delivered the invocation letter to European Council President Donald Tusk. This made 29 March 2019 the expected date that UK would leave EU.

2017 UK general election

In April 2017, Theresa May called a snap general election, held on 8 June, in an attempt to "strengthen [her] hand" in the negotiations; The Conservative Party, Labour and UKIP made manifesto pledges to implement the referendum, the Labour manifesto differing in its approach to Brexit negotiations, such as unilaterally offering permanent residence to EU immigrants. The Liberal Democrat Party and the Green Party manifestos proposed a policy of remaining in the EU via a second referendum. The Scottish National Party (SNP) manifesto proposed a policy of waiting for the outcome of the Brexit negotiations and then holding a referendum on Scottish independence.

The result produced an unexpected hung parliament, the governing Conservatives gained votes and remained the largest party but nevertheless lost seats and their majority in the House of Commons. Labour gained significantly on votes and seats, retaining its position as the second-largest party. The Liberal Democrats gained six seats despite a slight decrease in vote share compared with 2015. The Green Party kept its single MP while also losing national vote share. Losing votes and seats were the SNP, which lost 21 MPs, and UKIP, which suffered a −10.8% swing and lost its only MP. The Democratic Unionist Party (DUP) and Sinn Féin also made gains in votes and seats.

On 26 June 2017, Conservatives and the DUP reached a confidence and supply agreement whereby the DUP would back the Conservatives in key votes in the House of Commons over the course of the parliament. The agreement included additional funding of £1 billion for Northern Ireland, highlighted mutual support for Brexit and national security, expressed commitment to the Good Friday Agreement, and indicated that policies such as the state pension triple lock and Winter Fuel Payments would be maintained.

UK–EU negotiations in 2017 and 2018

Prior to the negotiations, May said that the British government would not seek permanent single market membership, would end ECJ jurisdiction, seek a new trade agreement, end free movement of people and maintain the Common Travel Area with Ireland. The EU had adopted its negotiating directives in May, and appointed Michel Barnier as Chief Negotiator. The EU wished to perform the negotiations in two phases: first the UK would agree to a financial commitment and to lifelong benefits for EU citizens in Britain, and then negotiations on a future relationship could begin. In the first phase, the member states would demand that the UK pay a "divorce bill", initially estimated as amounting to £52 billion. EU negotiators said that an agreement must be reached between UK and the EU by October 2018.

Negotiations commenced on 19 June 2017. Negotiating groups were established for three topics: the rights of EU citizens living in Britain and vice versa; Britain's outstanding financial obligations to the EU; and the border between Northern Ireland and the Republic of Ireland. In December 2017, a partial agreement was reached. It ensured that there would be no hard border in Ireland, protected the rights of UK citizens in the EU and of EU citizens in Britain, and estimated the financial settlement to be £35–39 billion. May stressed that "Nothing is agreed until everything is agreed". Following this partial agreement, EU leaders agreed to move on to the second phase in the negotiations: discussion of the future relationship, a transition period and a possible trade deal.

In March 2018, a 21-month transition period and the terms for it were provisionally agreed. In June 2018, Irish Taoiseach Leo Varadkar said that there had been little progress on the Irish border questionon which the EU proposed a backstop, to come into effect if no overall trade deal had been reached by the end of the transition periodand that it was unlikely that there would be a solution before October, when the whole deal was to be agreed. In July 2018, the British government published the Chequers plan, containing its aims for the future relationship that was to be determined in the negotiations. The plan sought to keep British access to the single market for goods, but not necessarily for services, while allowing for an independent trade policy. The plan caused cabinet resignations, including those of Brexit Secretary David Davis and Foreign Secretary Boris Johnson.

May's agreement and failed ratification

On 13 November 2018, UK and EU negotiators agreed the text of a draft withdrawal agreement, and May secured her Cabinet's backing of the deal the following day, though Brexit Secretary Dominic Raab resigned over "fatal flaws" in the agreement. It was expected that ratification in the British parliament would be difficult. On 25 November, all 27 leaders of the remaining EU countries endorsed the agreement.

On 10 December 2018, the Prime Minister postponed the vote in the House of Commons on her Brexit deal. This came minutes after the Prime Minister's Office confirmed the vote would be going ahead. Faced with the prospect of a defeat in the House of Commons, this option gave May more time to negotiate with Conservative backbenchers and the EU, even though they had ruled out further discussions. The decision was met with calls from many Welsh Labour MPs for a motion of no confidence in the Government.

Also on 10 December 2018, the European Court of Justice (ECJ) ruled that the UK could unilaterally revoke its notification of withdrawal, as long as it was still a member and had not agreed a withdrawal agreement. The decision to do so should be "unequivocal and unconditional" and "follow a democratic process". If the British revoked their notification, they would remain a member of the EU under their current membership terms. The case was launched by Scottish politicians, and referred to the ECJ by the Scottish Court of Session.

The European Research Group (ERG), a research support group of Eurosceptic Conservative MPs, opposed the Prime Minister's proposed Withdrawal Agreement treaty. Its members objected strongly to the Withdrawal Agreement's inclusion of the Irish backstop. ERG members also objected to the proposed £39 billion financial settlement with the EU and stated that the agreement would result in the UK's agreement to continuing to follow EU regulations in major policy areas; and to the continuing jurisdiction of the ECJ over interpretation of the agreement and of European law still applicable to the UK.

On 15 January 2019, the House of Commons voted 432 to 202 against the deal, which was the largest majority ever against a United Kingdom government. Soon after, a motion of no confidence in Her Majesty's Government was tabled by the opposition, which was rejected by 325 votes to 306.

On 24 February, Prime Minister May proposed that the next vote on the withdrawal agreement would be on 12 March 2019, 17 days away from the Brexit date. On 12 March, the proposal was defeated by 391 votes to 242a loss by 149 votes, down from 230 from when the deal had been proposed in January.

On 18 March 2019, the Speaker informed the House of Commons that a third meaningful vote could be held only on a motion that was significantly different from the previous one, citing parliamentary precedents going back to 1604.

The Withdrawal Agreement was brought back to the House without the attached understandings on 29 March. The Government's motion of support for the Withdrawal Agreement was defeated by 344 votes to 286a loss by 58 votes, down from 149 when the deal had been proposed on 12 March.

Article 50 extensions and Johnson's agreement
On 20 March 2019, the Prime Minister wrote to European Council President Tusk requesting that Brexit be postponed until 30 June 2019. On 21 March 2019, May presented her case to a European Council summit meeting in Brussels. After May left the meeting, a discussion amongst the remaining EU leaders resulted in the rejection of 30 June date and offered instead a choice of two new alternative Brexit dates. On 22 March 2019, the extension options were agreed between the British government and the European Council. The first alternative offered was that if MPs rejected May's deal in the next week, Brexit would be due to occur by 12 April 2019, with, or without, a deal—or alternatively another extension be asked for and a commitment to participate in the 2019 European Parliament elections given. The second alternative offered was that if MPs approved May's deal, Brexit would be due to occur on 22 May 2019. The later date was the day before the start of European Parliament elections. After the government deemed unwarranted the concerns over the legality of the proposed change (because it contained two possible exit dates) the previous day, on 27 March 2019 both the Lords (without a vote) and the Commons (by 441 to 105) approved the statutory instrument changing the exit date to 22 May 2019 if a withdrawal deal is approved, or 12 April 2019 if it is not. The amendment was then signed into law at 12:40 p.m. the next day.

Following the failure of the British Parliament to approve the Withdrawal Agreement by 29 March, the UK was required to leave the EU on 12 April 2019. On 10 April 2019, late-night talks in Brussels resulted in a further extension, to 31 October 2019; Theresa May had again requested an extension only until 30 June. Under the terms of this new extension, if the Withdrawal Agreement were to be passed before October, Brexit would occur on the first day of the subsequent month. The UK would then be obligated to hold European Parliament elections in May, or leave the EU on 1 June without a deal.

In granting the Article 50 extensions, the EU adopted a stance of refusing to "reopen" (that is, renegotiate) the Withdrawal Agreement. After Boris Johnson became prime minister on 24 July 2019 and met with EU leaders, the EU changed its stance. On 17 October 2019, following "tunnel talks" between UK and EU, a revised withdrawal agreement was agreed on negotiators level, and endorsed by the British government and the EU Commission. The revised deal contained a new Northern Ireland Protocol, as well as technical modifications to related articles. In addition, the Political Declaration was also revised. The revised deal and the political declaration was endorsed by the European Council later that day. To come into effect, it needed to be ratified by the European Parliament and the Parliament of the United Kingdom.

The British Parliament passed the European Union (Withdrawal) (No. 2) Act 2019, which received Royal Assent on 9 September 2019, obliging the Prime Minister to seek a third extension if no agreement has been reached at the next European Council meeting in October 2019. In order for such an extension to be granted if it is requested by the Prime Minister, it would be necessary for there to be unanimous agreement by all other heads of EU governments. On 28 October 2019, the third extension was agreed to by the EU, with a new withdrawal deadline of 31 January 2020. 'Exit day' in British law was then amended to this new date by statutory instrument on 30 October 2019.

2019 UK general election 

After Johnson was unable to induce Parliament to approve a revised version of the withdrawal agreement by the end of October, he chose to call for a snap election. Due to the fact three motions for an early general election under the Fixed-term Parliaments Act 2011 failed to achieve the necessary two-thirds super majority for it to pass so instead, in order to circumvent the existing law, the Government introduced a "election bill" which only needed a simple majority of MPs to vote in favour into the House of Commons which was passed by 438–20, setting the election date for Thursday 12 December. Opinion polls up to polling day showed a firm lead for the Conservatives against Labour throughout the campaign.

In the run-up to the general election on 12 December 2019 the Conservative Party pledged to leave the EU with the withdrawal agreement negotiated in October 2019. Labour promised to renegotiate aforementioned deal and hold a referendum, letting voters choose between the renegotiated deal and remain. The Liberal Democrats vowed to revoke Article 50, while the SNP intended to hold a second referendum, however, revoking Article 50 if the alternative was a no-deal exit. The DUP supported Brexit, but would seek to change parts related to Northern Ireland it was dissatisfied with. Plaid Cymru and the Green Party backed a second referendum, believing the UK should stay in the EU. The Brexit Party was the only major party running for election which wanted the UK to leave the EU without a deal.

The election produced a decisive result for Boris Johnson with the Conservatives winning 365 seats (gaining 47 seats) and an overall majority of 80 seats with Labour suffering their worst election defeat since 1935 after losing 60 seats to leave them with 202 seats and only a single seat in Scotland. The Liberal Democrats won just 11 seats with their leader Jo Swinson losing her own seat. The Scottish National Party won 48 seats after gaining 14 seats in Scotland.

The result broke the deadlock in the UK Parliament and ended the possibility of a referendum being held on the withdrawal agreement and ensured that the United Kingdom would leave the European Union on 31 January 2020.

Ratification and departure

Subsequently, the government introduced a bill to ratify the withdrawal agreement. It passed its second reading in the House of Commons in a 358–234 vote on 20 December 2019, and became law on 23 January 2020 as the European Union (Withdrawal Agreement) Act 2020.

The withdrawal agreement received the backing of the constitutional committee in the European Parliament on 23 January 2020, setting expectation that the entire parliament would approve it in a later vote. On the following day, Ursula von der Leyen and Charles Michel signed the withdrawal agreement in Brussels, and it was sent to London where Boris Johnson signed it. The European Parliament gave its consent to ratification on 29 January by 621 votes to 49. Immediately after voting approval, members of the European Parliament joined hands and sang Auld Lang Syne. The Council of the European Union concluded EU ratification the following day. At 11 p.m. GMT, 31 January 2020, the United Kingdom's membership of the European Union ended, 47 years after it had joined.

Transition period and final trade agreement

Following the British exit on 31 January 2020 the UK entered a Transition Period for the rest of 2020. Trade, travel and freedom of movement remain largely unchanged during this period.

The Withdrawal Agreement still applies after this date. This agreement provides free access of goods between Northern Ireland and the Republic of Ireland, provided checks are made to goods entering Northern Ireland from the rest of the UK. The British Government attempted to back out of this commitment by passing the Internal Market Bill: domestic legislation in the British Parliament. In September, Northern Ireland secretary Brandon Lewis said:

leading to the resignation of Sir Jonathan Jones, permanent secretary to the Government Legal Department and Lord Keen, the law officer for Scotland. The European Commission started legal action.

During the transition period, David Frost and Michel Barnier continued to negotiate a permanent trade agreement. On 24 December 2020 both parties announced that a deal had been reached. The deal was passed by both houses of the British parliament on 30 December and given Royal Assent in the early hours of the next day. In the House of Commons, the governing Conservatives and main opposition Labour voted in favour of the agreement whilst all other opposition parties voted against it. The transition period concluded under its terms the following evening. After the UK said it would unilaterally extend a grace period limiting checks on trade between Northern Ireland and Great Britain, the European Parliament postponed setting a date to ratify the agreement. The vote was later scheduled for 27 April when it passed with an overwhelming majority of votes.

There was a customs transitional arrangement in place until 1 July 2021. During this time period, traders importing standard goods from the EU to the UK could defer submitting their customs declarations and paying import duties to HMRC for up to six months. This arrangement simplified and avoided most import controls during the early months of the new situation and was designed to facilitate inward trade during the COVID-19 health crisis and to avoid major disruptions in domestic supply chains in the short term. Following reports that the border infrastructure was not ready, the UK government further postponed import checks from the EU to the UK until the end of the year in order to avoid supply issues during the ongoing Covid crisis. This was again followed by another delay of import controls, in a situation of truck driver shortages; the controls are scheduled to be phased in during 2022.

United Kingdom legislation after Article 50 notification

European Union (Withdrawal) Act 2018

In October 2016, Theresa May promised a "Great Repeal Bill", which would repeal the European Communities Act 1972 and restate in British law all enactments previously in force under EU law. Subsequently renamed the European Union (Withdrawal) Bill, it was introduced into the House of Commons on 13 July 2017.

On 12 September 2017, the Bill passed its first vote and second reading by a margin of 326 votes to 290 votes in the House of Commons. The Bill was further amended on a series of votes in both Houses. After the Act became law on 26 June 2018, the European Council decided on 29 June to renew its call on member states and European Union institutions to step up their work on preparedness at all levels and for all outcomes.

The Withdrawal Act fixed the period ending 21 January 2019 for the government to decide on how to proceed if the negotiations had not reached agreement in principle on both the withdrawal arrangements and the framework for the future relationship between the UK and EU; while, alternatively, making future ratification of the withdrawal agreement as a treaty between the UK and EU depend upon the prior enactment of another act of Parliament for approving the final terms of withdrawal when the Brexit negotiations were completed. In any event, the Act did not alter the two-year period for negotiating allowed by Article 50 that ended at the latest on 29 March 2019 if the UK had not by then ratified a withdrawal agreement or agreed a prolongation of the negotiating period.

The Withdrawal Act which became law in June 2018 allowed for various outcomes including no negotiated settlement. It authorises the government to bring into force, by order made under section 25, the provisions that fixed "exit day" and the repeal of the European Communities Act 1972, but exit day must be the same day and time as when the EU Treaties ceased to apply to the UK.

Exit day
Exit day was the end of 31 January 2020 CET (11.00 p.m. GMT). The European Union (Withdrawal) Act 2018 (as amended by a British Statutory Instrument on 11 April 2019), in section 20 (1), defined 'exit day' as 11:00 p.m. on 31 October 2019. Originally, 'exit day' was defined as 11:00 p.m. on 29 March 2019 GMT (UTC+0).

Additional government bills
A report published in March 2017 by the Institute for Government commented that, in addition to the European Union (Withdrawal) bill, primary and secondary legislation would be needed to cover the gaps in policy areas such as customs, immigration and agriculture. The report also commented that the role of the devolved legislatures was unclear, and could cause problems, and that as many as 15 new additional Brexit Bills might be required, which would involve strict prioritisation and limiting Parliamentary time for in-depth examination of new legislation.

In 2016 and 2017, the House of Lords published a series of reports on Brexit-related subjects, including:

 Brexit: the options for trade
 Brexit: UK–Irish relations
 Brexit: future UK–EU security and police cooperation
 Brexit: fisheries
 Brexit: environment and climate change
 Brexit: the Crown Dependencies
 Brexit: justice for families, individuals and businesses?
 Brexit: trade in non-financial services

Nuclear Safeguards Act 2018
The Nuclear Safeguards Act 2018, relating to withdrawal from Euratom, was presented to Parliament in October 2017. The act makes provision about nuclear safeguards, and for connected
purposes. The Secretary of State may by regulations ("nuclear safeguards regulations") make provision for the purpose of – (a) ensuring that qualifying nuclear material, facilities or
equipment are available only for use for civil activities (whether in the UK or elsewhere), or (b) giving effect to provisions of a relevant international agreement.

European Union (Withdrawal Agreement) Act 2020 

The European Union (Withdrawal Agreement) Act 2020 makes legal provision for ratifying the Brexit Withdrawal Agreement and incorporating it into the domestic law of the United Kingdom. The bill was first introduced by the government on 21 October 2019. This bill was not further debated and lapsed on 6 November when parliament was dissolved in preparation for the 2019 general election. The bill was reintroduced immediately following the general election and was the first bill to be put before the House of Commons in the first session of the 58th Parliament, with changes from the previous bill, by the re-elected government and was read a first time on 19 December, immediately after the first reading of the Outlawries Bill and before the debate on the Queen's Speech began. The second reading took place on 20 December, and the third on 9 January 2020. This act was given Royal Assent on 23 January 2020, nine days before the UK left the European Union.

Public opinion since the Brexit referendum

Prior to 2020 

One estimate of demographic changes (ignoring other effects) implies that had an EU referendum taken place  there would have been between 800,000 and 900,000 fewer Leave voters and between 600,000 and 700,000 more Remain voters, resulting in a Remain majority.

In March 2019, a petition submitted to the British Parliament petitions website, calling on the government to revoke Article 50 and stay in the EU, reached a record-level of more than 6.1 million signatures.

2020–present 

YouGov polling has shown a gradual but progressive decline in the public perception of the benefits of Brexit, with the overall margin of sentiment about the rightness of the Brexit decision declining from slightly positive in 2016 to –11% in 2022. A May 2022 poll showed that a majority of respondents who expressed an opinion thought that Brexit had gone either "badly" or "very badly". A new study showed that since Brexit, citizens in other European nations were more against leaving the EU than they had been since 2016. Recent polls in Great Britain also reflect these numbers with 54% of poll respondents believed that the country was wrong to leave the European Union, while 35% of respondents believed it was the right decision.

No-deal planning

On 19 December 2018, the EU Commission revealed its "no-deal" Contingency Action Plan in specific sectors, in respect of the UK leaving the EU "in 100 days' time."

In the wake of the United Kingdom's vote to leave the European Union, the Department for International Trade (DIT) for reaching and extending trade agreements between the UK and non-EU states was created by Prime Minister May, shortly after she took office on 13 July 2016. By 2017, it employed about 200 trade negotiators and was overseen by then Secretary of State for International Trade Liam Fox. In March 2019, the British government announced that it would cut many import tariffs to zero, in the event of a no-deal Brexit. The Confederation of British Industry said the move would be a "sledgehammer for our economy", and the National Farmer's Union was also highly critical. Additionally, the plan appeared to breach standard WTO rules.

On 2 June 2020, Chancellor of Germany Angela Merkel stated that the European Union must prepare for the possible failure of Brexit trade talks with the UK. She added that negotiations were being accelerated to try and reach a deal that could be ratified by the end of the year. Her warning came as the deadline for extending talks passed, with negotiations expected to end on 31 December with or without a deal.

Litigation
There has been litigation to explore the constitutional footings on which Brexit stands after R (Miller) v Secretary of State for Exiting the European Union (simply known as the "Miller case") and the 2017 Notification Act:
 In R. (Webster) v Secretary of State for Exiting the European Union, a Divisional Court of Gross LJ and Green MR determined that the substantive decision to leave the EU that was notified on 29 March 2017 was in fact the executive decision of the Prime Minister using a statutory power of decision found to have been delegated to her by the Notification Act: this is confirmed by the House of Commons Library commentary on the case. The case was appealed to the Court of Appeal and paragraph 15 of the judgement, along with the citable nature of the decision were upheld. While the case was criticised academically by Robert Craig, who lectures in jurisprudence at the London School of Economics, aspects of the case's analysis were supported by the Supreme Court in Miller 2 at paragraph 57, which confirmed:

 This confirmation that the decision was an executive act was part of the basis of R. (Wilson) v. Prime Minister which allied this point with the concerns about the irregularities in the referendum. The High Court hearing was on 7 December 2018 before Ouseley MJ and when judgement was given it was held that: courts' job was not to rule on irregularities in the 'leave' campaign as these were not questions of law; it was also said that the case was brought both too early and too late. Judgement in the Court of Appeal (before Hickinbottom LJ and Haddon-Cave LJ) before also went against the applicant.
 Regarding the reversibility of a notification under Article 50, Wightman and others v Secretary of State for Exiting the European Union was referred to the Court of Justice of the European Union; the UK government sought to block this referral, taking the matter on appeal to the Supreme Court, but was unsuccessful. On 10 December 2018, the Court of Justice of the EU ruled that the UK could unilaterally revoke its Article 50 notification.

Impact

Many effects of Brexit depended on whether the UK left with a withdrawal agreement, or before an agreement was ratified ("no-deal" Brexit). In 2017, the Financial Times said that there were approximately 759 international agreements, spanning 168 non-EU countries, that the UK would no longer be a party to upon leaving the EU.

Economic effects

Economists expected that Brexit would have damaging immediate and longer term effects on the economies of the UK and at least part of the EU27. In particular, there was a broad consensus among economists and in the economic literature that Brexit would likely reduce the UK's real per capita income in the medium and long term, and that the Brexit referendum itself would damage the economy. Studies found that Brexit-induced uncertainty reduced British GDP, British national income, investment by business, employment and British international trade from June 2016 onwards.

A 2019 analysis found that British firms substantially increased offshoring to the EU after the Brexit referendum, whereas European firms reduced new investments in the UK. The British government's own Brexit analysis, leaked in January 2018, showed that British economic growth would be stunted by 2–8% over the 15 years following Brexit, the amount depending on the leave scenario. Economists warned that London's future as an international financial centre depended on passport agreements with the EU. Pro-Brexit activists and politicians have argued for negotiating trade and migration agreements with the "CANZUK" countries—those of Canada, Australia, New Zealand and the United Kingdom—but economists have said that trade deals with those countries would be far less valuable to the UK than EU membership. Studies projected that Brexit would exacerbate regional economic inequality in the UK, by hitting already-struggling regions the hardest.

Local and geographic effects

The potential impact on the border between Northern Ireland and the Republic of Ireland has been a contentious issue. Since 2005, the border has been essentially invisible. After Brexit, it became the only UK–EU land border (not counting the land borders EU states, Spain and Cyprus, have with British Overseas Territories). All involved parties agreed a hard border should be avoided, for it might compromise the Good Friday Agreement that ended the Northern Ireland conflict. To forestall this, the EU proposed a "backstop agreement" that would have kept the UK in the Customs Union and kept Northern Ireland in some aspects of the Single Market also, until a lasting solution was found. The UK Parliament rejected this proposal. After further negotiations in autumn of 2019, an alternative model, the Ireland/Northern Ireland Protocol was agreed between the UK and the EU. Under the Protocol, Northern Ireland is formally outside the EU single market, but EU free movement of goods rules and EU Customs Union rules still apply; this ensures there are no customs checks or controls between Northern Ireland and the rest of the island. In place of an Ireland/Northern Ireland land border, the protocol has created a  customs "Irish Sea border" for goods from (but not to) Great Britain, to the disquiet of prominent Unionists.

After the Brexit referendum, the Scottish Government – led by the Scottish National Party (SNP) – planned another independence referendum because Scotland voted to remain in the EU while England and Wales voted to leave. It had suggested this before the Brexit referendum. The First Minister of Scotland, Nicola Sturgeon, requested a referendum be held before the UK's withdrawal, but the British Prime Minister rejected this timing, but not the referendum itself. At the referendum in 2014, 55% of voters had decided to remain in the UK, but the referendum on Britain's withdrawal from the EU was held in 2016, with 62% of Scottish voters against it. In March 2017, the Scottish Parliament voted in favour of holding another independence referendum. Sturgeon called for a "phased return" of an independent Scotland back to the EU. In 2017, if Northern Ireland remained associated with the EU – for example, by remaining in the Customs Union, some analysts argued Scotland would also insist on special treatment. However, in the event, the only part of the United Kingdom which received unique treatment was Northern Ireland.

On 21 March 2018, the Scottish Parliament passed the Scottish Continuity Bill. This was passed due to stalling negotiations between the Scottish Government and the British Government on where powers within devolved policy areas should lie after Brexit. The Act allowed for all devolved policy areas to remain within the remit of the Scottish Parliament and reduces the executive power upon exit day that the UK Withdrawal Bill provides for Ministers of the Crown. The bill was referred to the UK Supreme Court, which found that it could not come into force as the European Union (Withdrawal) Act 2018, which received royal assent between the Scottish Parliament passing its bill and the Supreme Court's judgement, designated itself under schedule4 of the Scotland Act 1998 as unamendable by the Scottish Parliament. The bill has therefore not received royal assent.

Gibraltar, a British Overseas Territory bordering Spain, is affected by Brexit too. Spain asserts a territorial claim on Gibraltar. After the referendum, Spain's Foreign Minister renewed calls for joint Spanish–British control. In late 2018, the British and Spanish governments agreed that any dispute over Gibraltar would not affect Brexit negotiations, and the British government agreed that UK–EU treaties made after Brexit would not automatically apply to Gibraltar. In December 2020, Spain and the UK reached an agreement in principle on future arrangements for Brexit and invited the European Commission to formalise it as a treaty.

The French and British governments say they remain committed to the Le Touquet Agreement, which lets UK border checks be completed in France, and vice versa (juxtaposed controls). The two governments signed the Sandhurst Treaty in January 2018, which will shorten the time taken to process migrants attempting to reach the UK from Calais, from six months to one month. The UK also announced it will invest a further £44.5 million on border security at the English Channel.

Effects on the European Union

Brexit caused the European Union to lose its second-largest economy, its third-most populous country, and the second-largest net contributor to the EU budget.

The UK is no longer a shareholder in the European Investment Bank, where it had 16% of the shares. The European Investment Bank's Board of Governors decided that the remaining member states would proportionally increase their capital subscriptions to maintain the same level of overall subscribed capital (EUR 243.3 billion). As of March 2020, the subscribed capital of the EIB had increased by an additional EUR 5.5 billion, following the decision by two member states to increase their capital subscriptions (Poland and Romania). The EIB's total subscribed capital thus amounted to EUR 248.8 billion. Brexit did not impact the EIB Group's AAA credit rating.

Analyses indicated that the departure of the relatively economically liberal UK would reduce the ability of remaining economically liberal countries to block measures in the Council of the EU. In 2019, ahead of Brexit, the European Medicines Agency and European Banking Authority moved their headquarters from London to Amsterdam and Paris, respectively.

Sectorial effects
The UK has left the Common Agricultural Policy (CAP), which provides government financial support to farmers in the EU. Brexit allowed the UK to develop its own agriculture policy and the Agriculture Act 2020 replaced the CAP with a new system. The UK did also leave the Common Fisheries Policy (CFP) that lets all EU countries fish within 12 nautical miles of the British coast and lets the EU set catch quotas. The combined EU fishing fleets landed about six million tonnes of fish per year, as of 2016, about half of which were from British waters. By leaving the CFP, the UK could develop its own fisheries policy. The UK did also leave the London Fisheries Convention that lets Irish, French, Belgian, Dutch and German vessels fish within six nautical miles of the UK's coast.

Brexit poses challenges to British academia and research, as the UK loses research funding from EU sources and sees a reduction in students from the EU. Academic institutions find it harder to hire researchers from the EU and British students will face greater difficulties with studying abroad in the EU. The UK was a member of the European Research Area and likely to wish to remain an associated member following Brexit. The British government has guaranteed funding for research currently funded by EU.

An early 2019 study found that Brexit would deplete the National Health Service (NHS) workforce, create uncertainties regarding care for British nationals living in the EU, and put at risk access to vaccines, equipment, and medicines. The Department of Health and Social Care has said it has taken steps to ensure the continuity of medical supplies after Brexit. The number of non-British EU nurses registering with the NHS fell from 1,304 in July 2016 to 46 in April 2017.In June 2016, 58,702 NHS staff recorded a non-British EU nationality, and in June 2022, 70,735 NHS staff recorded an EU nationality. However, "to present this as the full story would be misleading, because there are over 57,000 more staff for whom nationality is known now than in 2016"

Under the European Union (Withdrawal) Act 2018, EU laws will no longer have supremacy over British laws after Brexit. To maintain continuity, the Act converts EU law into British law as "retained EU law". After Brexit, the British parliament (and the devolved legislatures) can decide which elements of that law to keep, amend or repeal. Furthermore, British courts will no longer be bound by the judgments of the EU Court of Justice after Brexit.

After Brexit, the UK is able to control immigration from the EU and EEA, as it can end EU freedom of movement. The current British government intends to replace it with a new system The government's 2018 white paper proposes a "skills-based immigration system" that prioritises skilled migrants. EU and EEA citizens already living in the UK can continue living there after Brexit by applying to the EU Settlement Scheme, which began in March 2019. Irish citizens will not have to apply to the scheme. Studies estimate that Brexit and the end of free movement will likely result in a large decline in immigration from EEA countries to the UK. After Brexit, any foreigner wanting to do so more than temporarily would need a work permit.

By leaving the EU, the UK would leave the European Common Aviation Area (ECAA), a single market in commercial air travel, but could negotiate a number of different future relationships with the EU. British airlines would still have permission to operate within the EU with no restrictions, and vice versa. The British government seeks continued participation in the European Aviation Safety Agency (EASA). The UK has its own air service agreements with 111 countries, which permit flights to-and-from the country, and further 17 countries through its EU membership. These have since been replaced. Ferries will continue, but with obstacles such as customs checks. New ferry departures between the Republic of Ireland and the European mainland have been established. , the government's Goods Vehicle Movement Service, an IT system essential to post-Brexit goods movements, was still only in the early stages of beta testing, with four months to go before it is required to be in operation.

Concerns were raised by European lawmakers, including Michel Barnier, that Brexit might create security problems for the UK given that its law enforcement and counter-terrorism forces would no longer have access to the EU's security databases.

Some analysts have suggested that the severe economic impact of the COVID-19 pandemic in the UK has masked the economic impact of Brexit in 2021. In December 2021, the Financial Times quoted a range of economists as saying that the economic impact of Brexit on the UK economy and living standards "appears to be negative but uncertain". According to the Office for Budget Responsibility, the new trade agreement between the EU and UK could, over time, result in a 4% reduction in British productivity, compared with its level had the 2016 EU referendum gone the other way.

Brexit was widely described as a factor contributing to the 2021 United Kingdom natural gas supplier crisis, in which panic buying led to serious disruption of road fuel supplies across the UK, as it exacerbated the UK's shortage of HGV drivers. In a July 2021 report, the Road Haulage Association estimated the UK faced a shortage of up to 100,000 truck drivers.

Cultural references

Brexit has inspired many creative works, such as murals, sculptures, novels, plays, movies and video games. The response of British artists and writers to Brexit has in general been negative, reflecting a reported overwhelming percentage of people involved in Britain's creative industries voting against leaving the European Union. Despite issues around immigration being central in the Brexit debate, British artists left the migrants' perspective largely unexplored. However, Brexit also inspired UK-based migrant artists to create new works and "claim agency over their representation within public spaces and create a platform for a new social imagination that can facilitate transnational and trans-local encounters, multicultural democratic spaces, sense of commonality, and solidarity."

See also

 International reactions to the 2016 United Kingdom European Union membership referendum
 Opposition to Brexit in the United Kingdom
 Referendums related to the European Union
 Multi-speed Europe
 Interpretation of EU Treaty law by European Court of Justice
 2010s in United Kingdom political history
 2020s in United Kingdom political history
 Danish withdrawal from the European Union
 Dutch withdrawal from the European Union
 Frexit
 Greek withdrawal from the eurozone
 Hungarian withdrawal from the European Union
 Polexit
 Romanian withdrawal from the European Union

Notes

References

Further reading

 Ansorg, N. & Haastrup, T.: "Brexit Beyond the UK's Borders: What It Means for Africa", GIGA Focus Afrika No. 03/2016
 
 Carl, N., Dennison, J. & Evans, G.: "European but not European Enough: An Explanation for Brexit", European Union Politics Volume: 20 issue: 2, page(s): 282-304
 
 
 
 
 Freedland, Jonathan, "Fools Rush Out", The New York Review of Books, vol. LXVI, no. 14 (26 September 2019), pp. 30, 32, 34–35.
 Freedman, Lawrence D. "Britain Adrift: The United Kingdom's Search for a Post-Brexit Role". Foreign Affairs (May/June 2020) 39#3 pp. 118–130.
 Hayton, Richard. "British conservatism after the vote for Brexit: The ideological legacy of David Cameron". British Journal of Politics and International Relations 20.1 (2018): 223–238. online
 
 
 
 
 Outhwaite, William (ed.) Brexit: Sociological Responses. (London: Anthem Press, 2017). 
 
 

 Shipman, Tim. All Out War: The Full Story of How Brexit Sank Britain's Political Class (2016) excerpt
 Shipman, Tim. Fall Out: A Year of Political Mayhem (William Collins, 2018), on Brexit debates in 2017

External links

 Early Parliamentary General Election Bill 2019–20, Progress in Parliament 
 British government's Brexit information
 British government's official negotiation documents
 European Parliament – Brexit impact studies
 Brexit news on Eur-Lex website
 Legal Effect of the Protocol on Ireland/Northern Ireland, Attorney General's advice to Prime Minister, 13 November 2018
 British government's Explainer (for the withdrawal agreement) 14 November 2018
 House of Lords report analysing the proposed Withdrawal Agreement, 5December 2018
 EU's official negotiation documents
 British Parliament – Brexit News
 Reading list of post-EU Referendum publications by Parliament and the Devolved Assemblies – House of Commons Library
 Record of Brexit-related business in the devolved legislatures (Northern Ireland, Scotland and Wales) – House of Commons Library
 Gov.UK – Department for Exiting the European Union
 BBC: "Brexit: What are the options?" (10 October 2016)
 BBC: "Brexit vote: What could happen next?" (17 December 2018)
 The Brexit Papers, Bar Council, December 2016
 "Plan for Britain: The government's negotiating objectives for exiting the EU": PM's speech delivered and published on 17 January 2017 – transcript of speech as delivered at Lancaster House, London
 The United Kingdom's exit from and new partnership with the European Union, February 2017 ("White paper")
 
 Quotes about Brexit on Euronews
 European Council Brexit Guidelines
 "The economic effects of the government's proposed Brexit deal" —National Institute of Economic and Social Research, November 2018
 How will Brexit affect the UK's manufacturing industry? UK Trade Policy Observatory, February 2018
 The real post-Brexit options  Lecture by Ivan Rogers at the University of Glasgow, 23 May 2018
 "What are the options for the UK's trading relationship with the EU after Brexit?"  UK in a Changing Europe, King's College London, December 2018
 "Brexit phrasebook: a guide to the talks' key terms"—The Guardian, 23 November 2018
 "Lord Ashcroft: How the United Kingdom voted on EU referendum day – and why" Conservative Home, 17 March 2019
 Explanatory Memorandum for the Withdrawal of the United Kingdom from the European Union (Consequential Provisions) Bill 2019 introduced by the Irish government in the legislature (Oireachtas)
 EU Council decision, 22 March 2019, extending the negotiating period

Relating to court cases
Judgment of the Supreme Court of the United Kingdom in R (Miller) v Secretary of State for Exiting the European Union
Judgment of the European Court of Justice in the Wightman case: Right of unilateral revocation of the notification
Wilson v Prime Minister (2018) EWHC 3520 (Admin) 
Ewan McGaughey "Could Brexit be Void?" "King's Law Journal", Volume 29, 2018, Issue 3
UK withdrawal from the European Union: Legal and procedural issues European Parliamentary Research Service, March 2017
Ronan McCrea. "The legal issues of revoking the notification to leave the EU – but then notifying to leave again". London School of Economics, 20 December 2018

 
2010s neologisms
English words and phrases
Euroscepticism in the United Kingdom
Portmanteaus
United Kingdom and the European Union
Articles containing video clips